Anodonthyla moramora is a species of microhylidae frog. This species is native to Madagascar.

References

Anodonthyla
Amphibians described in 2005